Sandrine Testud and Roberta Vinci won in the final 7–5, 7–6(7–4) against Kristie Boogert and Miriam Oremans.

Seeds
Champion seeds are indicated in bold text while text in italics indicates the round in which those seeds were eliminated.

 Alexandra Fusai /  Rita Grande (first round)
 Kristie Boogert /  Miriam Oremans (final)
 Nannie de Villiers /  Annabel Ellwood (quarterfinals)
 Liezel Horn /  Maria Vento (quarterfinals)

Draw

References
 2001 Qatar Total Fina Elf Open Doubles Draw

2001 Qatar Total Fina Elf Open – Doubles
2001 WTA Tour
2001 in Qatari sport